Yahya Alkafri (born in Syria) is a Syrian television actor and  voice actor.

Early life
He graduated from the Higher Institute of Theatrical Arts in 1988, and before that won the Engineering Diploma Decor Interior Department in 1983, is a member of the National Theater in Syria, of the highlights of his works (the civilization of the Arabs, punishment, relative calm) has many of the TV business in the field of dubbing animation.

Filmography

Television 
Arab civilization 
Punishment
Relative calm
Dubbing heartbeat Arabic
Lawrence of Arabia
Bramble
The dust brothers
Justice desert

Dubbing roles 
The Mask: Animated Series as Stanley Ipkiss/The Mask
Detective Conan - Ninzaburo Shiratori
Samurai 7 as Shimada Kambei
Kamen Rider Ryuki
Wolverine and the X-Men - Nightcrawler
Batman: The Animated Series as The Joker (Venus dub)
Honō no Dōkyūji: Dodge Danpei
Hakugei: Legend of the Moby Dick
Sangokushi
Inuyasha as Myoga
One Piece as Mr. 2
The Flintstones as Barney Rubble (2nd voice)
Beyblade as Michael Summers
Magical Princess Minky Momo
Grimm's Fairy Tale Classics
Topo Gigio as Topo Gigio
The Sword and the Chess of Death
Iron Kid as Steeljaw Jack
Hunter × Hunter as Franklin , Seaquant , Nostrade Butler , Chrollo Lucilfer (episodes 51–56), Bean 
Danball Senki as Junichirou Yamano , Yoshimitsu Kaidou , Masashi Hosoi
Masha and the Bear
Masha's Tales (uncredited)
Beyblade: Metal Fusion as Ryuga
Beyblade: Metal Masters as Ryuga
Beyblade: Metal Fury as Ryuga
Ben 10 - Dr. Animo, Stinkfly
Opti-Morphs
Super Wings - Big Wing (Venus Centre version)
The Fairly OddParents as Sheldon Dinkleberg (Classical Arabic version) (uncredited)
Sonic Boom (season 2) - Cubot (First Voice)
Ranma ½

References

Syrian male voice actors
Living people
Syrian male television actors
Place of birth missing (living people)
Year of birth missing (living people)
Syrian voice directors